Indio is the second studio album by Australian pop group, Indecent Obsession. It was released in Australia in August 1992.

Track listing
Australia
 "Rebel With a Cause" - 4:24
 "Kiss Me" - 4:35
 "Paula Forgot" - 0:08
 "Maybe You" - 5:09
 "Indio" - 4:06
 "Gentleman Style"	- 4:25
 "Billionaires Learn to Swing"	- 0:22
 "Hunger" - 5:02
 "Cry for Freedom" - 5:10
 "Poperotica" - 0:11
 "One Woman Man" - 4:23
 "Talking in Venice" - 0:17
 "Living in a Fishbowl" - 5:03
 "Whispers in the Dark" - 4:47
 "Pray For Rain" - 4:52

Written by – 
 Coyne (tracks: 1 to 5, 7 to 10, 12, 13, 15), 
 Sims (tracks: 1 to 5, 7 to 10, 12, 13, 15), 
 Dixon, Wolf (tracks: 1 to 10, 12 to 15), 
 Szumowsky, Wolf (tracks: 1 to 10, 12 to 15), 
 Neigher (tracks: 11)

Weekly charts

Credits
 Vocals – David Dixon, Andrew Coyne, Darryl Sims, Michael Szumowski
 Backing vocals [additional] – Ina Wolf, J.D. Nicholas, Jeff Pescetto, Maxi Anderson, Mona Lisa Young
 Bass, keyboards [additional] – Peter Wolf 
 Drums, percussion – Darryl Sims
 Engineer – Paul Ericksen
 Engineer [assistant mix engineer] – Chris Theis, John Jackson 
 Guitar – Andrew Coyne
 Keyboards – Michael Szumowski
 Mastered by Stephen Marcussen
 Mixed by Michael Brauer

References

1992 albums
Indecent Obsession albums